Erik von Loewis (1904–1986) was a German stage actor and director. He also acted in film and television. Born in Estonia, he was of Baltic German heritage.

Partial filmography
 Fridericus (1937) - Stabsoffizier
 Don't Promise Me Anything (1937) - (uncredited)
 The Yellow Flag (1937) - Schiffssteward
 The Model Husband (1937) - Linienerichter (uncredited)
 The Indian Tomb (1938) - Reporter
 The Man Who Couldn't Say No (1938) - Guilio, Elsas Bruder
 By a Silken Thread (1938) - Begleiter Eickhoffs bei der Hochzeitstafel
 Pour le Mérite (1938)
 Grube Morgenrot (1948)
 Und wieder 48 (1948) - Adjutant des Königs
 The Berliner (1948) - Franzose (uncredited)
 Don't Dream, Annette (1949) - Monsieur Picard
 Quartet of Five (1949) - Oberarzt
 The Beaver Coat (1949) - Wilhelm Böllsche
 The Blue Swords (1949) - Leutnant von Kittwitz
 Und wenn's nur einer wär''' (1949) - Vorsitzender im Gericht
 Bürgermeister Anna (1950) - Lehrer Schmidt
 The Witch (1954)
 Sergeant Borck (1955) - Kriminalhauptkommissar Dr. Kopp
 The Barrings (1955) - Hofrat Herbst
 The Story of Anastasia (1956) - Baron von Walepp 
 Spy for Germany (1956) - Schäfer
 Der Adler vom Velsatal (1957)
 The Fox of Paris (1957) - Gen. Eisner
 Rosemary (1958) - von Killenschiff
 Restless Night (1958)
 Stalingrad: Dogs, Do You Want to Live Forever? (1959)
 Lockvogel der Nacht (1959) - (uncredited)
 Die schöne Lügnerin (1959) - General Seidelbast (uncredited)
 Adorable Arabella (1959)
 The Last Witness (1960) - Mitglied von Rameils Gesellschaft (uncredited)
 Eine hübscher als die andere (1961)
 The Squeaker (1963) - Juwelier
 DM-Killer (1965) - Mr. von Bredow
 Die fromme Helene (1965) - Bürgermeister Hartlaub
 Playgirl (1966)
 Long Legs, Long Fingers (1966) - Anwalt
 Liebe Mutter, mir geht es gut (1972)

 References 

 Bibliography 
 Giesen, Rolf.  Nazi Propaganda Films: A History and Filmography''. McFarland, 2003.

External links 
 

1904 births
1986 deaths
People from Tartu
Baltic-German people
German male television actors
German male film actors
German male stage actors